Mineral Springs is an unincorporated community in Adams County, Ohio.

History
A post office called Mineral Springs was established in 1868 and remained in operation until 1919. The community was named for a mineral spa near it. 
Inscription. "Mineral Springs Health Resort formally known as Soadaville. Before becoming a place where people from all over the world came to visit. It was fields and farmland in the southernmost part of Adams County Ohio. Before this land was settled by white Europeans, the Native Americans lived and hunted these lands of Adams County. I have been said that the Native Americans, recognized the importance of these waters and used it themselves for its mineral properties. This was frontier country, wild, and full of hope and dreams for people building new lives for themselves. Families had settled here creating their own small community, making lives for themselves.
Sitting at the base of Peach Mountain (Grassy Hill) in a beautiful valley of fields and numerous natural springs feeding the creek.  I wasn’t till a man of the name of Charles Matheny saw the business opportunity with the natural springs in the valley. Being at the time the large national movement of mineral waters supposed to cure all ailments of the bodies. Took the opportunity to capitalize on the natural springs and the beauty of the valley. He erected a hotel to accommodate the droves of people coming to the springs already camping, many squatting on the land. 
The growth of the Health Resort was more than anyone would have imagined. Growing to the size covering 427 acers. Having 2 hotels in the valley, cabins, a general store, post office, telegraph and phone lines in the hotel. Large barns to accommodate the horses, carriages then later the automobiles. Even an ice cream shop in the large hotel. One of the first in southern Adams County." A History of forgotten dreams: The hope of a miracle cure and a history of Mineral Springs Health Resort By: Bethany Allen "A beautiful chapel on the grounds for the church going guests, commodious amusement hall for entertainment of those seeking diversion in bowling, billiards, dancing, and such recreation."  The Gazette, Hillbourgh Ohio newspaper Mineral Springs Health Resort advertisement 
 Medicinal value of springs promoted by Charles Matheny, 1840. First hotel built 1864 and resort named Sodaville. Under ownership of General Benjamin Coates, 1888–91, Smith Grimes 1891–08, and J. W. Rogers 1908–20. Mineral Springs Health Resort nationally known for its large hotel complex and recreational facilities. This hotel destroyed by fire 1924. Smaller hotel built 1904 quarter mile north continued operation through 1940.
PDF: Ohio Southland Journal, Volume 6, Number 2. “Mineral Springs, Adams County Ohio” 1995 article by Stephen Kelly. “For almost a century, Adams County possessed such a health resort. Located about six miles southeast of present-day Peebles, it was commonly known as Mineral Springs, Adams County, Ohio. It was situated on the Dry Fork of Turkey Creek at the foot of Peach Mountain. This once famous resort dates back to 1840 when a local resident, Charles Matheny, found the waters from one of the mineral springs in the area acted strongly on his kidneys and gave him relief from a persistent renal disorder. Word of his "cure" became widespread and soon a number of ailing hopefuls flocked to the area seeking help from the red sulphur spring from which Charles had drunk.”.

References

Unincorporated communities in Adams County, Ohio
1868 establishments in Ohio
Unincorporated communities in Ohio